Felsenburg, or Felsenburg Castle, may refer to:

 Felsenburg (Bern), a castle in the Swiss city of Bern
 Felsenburg (Kandergrund), a ruined castle in Kandergrund in the Swiss canton of Bern

Other uses
 Felsenburg is the German word for a rock castle, which is a type of hill castle